North Reston is a village in the civil parish of Reston, in the East Lindsey district of Lincolnshire, England, and on the A157 road about  south-east from the town of Louth. It is in the civil parish of Reston.

The parish church is dedicated to Saint Edith and a Grade II* listed building. Dating from the 11th century, it was largely rebuilt using greenstone and ironstone in 1868 by R. T. Withers, with some reused early medieval material.

North Reston Hall is a Grade II listed late 17th-century painted brick farmhouse with early 19th-century additions and some 20th-century alterations.

References

External links

Villages in Lincolnshire
East Lindsey District